Charles Uwagbai is a  Nigerian Canadian filmmaker. He hails from Edo state of the Southern part of Nigeria.
Charles Uwagbai is an media producer and director. He has experiences in media production, editing, directing, and animation. His works include TV/radio commercials, documentaries, reality shows and movies, among others.

Early life
Charles Uwagbai is an Edo-born graduate of Engineering from Ekiti State University He enrolled at the New York Film Academy and trained under directors like Andy Amenechi and Alex Mouth. He started his career with motion graphics and animations but has since moved on to make some of Nollywood's cinema movies like Black Silhouette, Breathless, The Ghost and the Tout, Kondo Games.

Career
Charles Uwagbai made his first movie titled 'Okoro, the Prince" in the year 2010. The movie starred actors such as late Sam Loco, Alex Osifo and a host of many other. But before then, he has been involved in other projects and other films. He started out in the music industry, and shot music videos, and TV commercials before he ventured into Nollywood.

See also
 List of Nigerian actors
 List of Nigerian film producers
 List of Nigerian film directors

References

Living people
New York Film Academy alumni
Year of birth missing (living people)
Igbo actors
Ekiti State University alumni
Nigerian film producers
Nigerian film directors
Nigerian media personalities
Nigerian documentary filmmakers
Nigerian television personalities
People from Edo State
Nigerian editors
Nigerian television directors